The second USS Buck (DD-420), a World War II-era  in the service of the United States Navy, was named after Quartermaster James Buck, a Civil War Medal of Honor recipient. It was built by Philadelphia Naval Shipyard and launched in 1939. It was a member of the convoy carrying the US 1st Provisional Marine Brigade. She served during the Second World War. It was sunk by the German submarine  on 9 October 1943 off the coast of Salerno, when it was working in support of Operation Avalanche. It received 3 battle stars for its services during the Second World War.

Early career
Buck was launched on 22 May 1939 by the Philadelphia Navy Yard. It was sponsored by Mrs. Julius C. Townsend, wife of Rear Admiral Townsend, and commissioned on 15 May 1940.

After shakedown training, Buck joined the Atlantic Fleet for a brief period before augmenting the Pacific Fleet from February until June 1941. On 1 July, as part of Task Force (TF) 19, Buck got underway for NS Argentia, Newfoundland, where it joined a convoy carrying US's 1st Provisional Marine Brigade to Reykjavík, Iceland. After landing the Marines there on 7 July, the destroyer began convoy escort duty between Iceland and the United States.

World War II

Atlantic convoys
With the entry of the United States into World War II Buck continued to serve as a convoy escort, steaming from the seaports of the eastern United States to ports in Newfoundland, Iceland, Northern Ireland, North Africa, and the Caribbean. As a convoy escort warship, Buck screened ships from enemy attack, pursued unidentified surface and underwater contacts and shepherded merchantmen to keep them in formation while underway.

While escorting a convoy during a dense fog off Nova Scotia on 22 August 1942, Buck was struck starboard side by the New Zealand troop-transport Awatea while trying to escort another vessel to her correct position in the convoy. The impact broke Bucks keel and sliced about two-thirds through the fantail. Seven sailors were killed in the collision. As the starboard propeller was wrecked, and the port propeller damaged, the destroyer maintained to steer away with a lot of difficulty as the crew tried to secure the fantail with lines and wires. When the port propeller fell off a few hours later, leaving the destroyer helpless, the fantail was cut loose since wave action was battering and chafing the hull. When the destroyer  came to assist she was mortally damaged by a collision with oiler . After rescuing the survivors from Ingraham, the oiler managed to take Buck under tow until relieved by the fleet tug . Buck reached Boston on 26 August, where she underwent repairs until November. Upon completion of yard work she returned to Atlantic convoy escort duty that winter, guarding convoys to European waters into June 1943, when she was ordered to the Mediterranean for patrol duty out of Tunisian and Algerian ports.

European invasions
Assigned to the Western Naval Task Force on 8 July, Buck performed bombardment, screening, and patrol duties during Operation Husky, the invasion of Sicily (10 July 1943). On 10 July, the destroyer escorted a landing convoy of LCTs to the beach before retiring to escort follow-on convoys to Sicily. On 3 August, while escorting a convoy of six cargo ships from Sicily to Algeria, Buck spotted the Italian submarine  making a reconnaissance patrol off the Sicilian coast. The destroyer pursued and forced the submarine to surface after three depth charge attacks.

After escorting a convoy back to the United States, the destroyer returned to the Mediterranean in late September 1943 in support of Operation Avalanche, the landings at Salerno, Italy. Following the landings, the destroyer patrolled off the coast to protect the delivery of reinforcements and supplies to southern Italy. While on patrol off Salerno, Italy, on 9 October, Buck was ambushed just after midnight by German submarine  commanded by Siegfried Koitschka and hit forward starboard by at least one and possibly two torpedoes. The warship flooded quickly, settling down forward and sinking within four minutes. Although most of the depth charges were set to safe before the destroyer was abandoned, a severe underwater explosion killed and wounded sailors in the water. Spotted by friendly aircraft the next morning, 97 survivors were rescued by the destroyer  and the British LCT-170 the following evening.

Buck received three battle stars for World War II service.

Convoys escorted

References

 Roll of Honor

Sims-class destroyers
World War II destroyers of the United States
Ships built in Philadelphia
World War II shipwrecks in the Mediterranean Sea
Ships sunk by German submarines in World War II
1939 ships
Maritime incidents in October 1943